{{Infobox criminal
| name = Sashadhar Choudhury
| image_name     =
| image_size     =200px
| image_alt      =
| image_caption = 
| birth_name = Sailen Choudhury
| birth_date = 1965
| birth_place = Helacha gaon,Nalbari, Assam
| death_date = 
| death_place = 
| cause = 
| alias = 
| motive = 
| charge = Waging war against India, Possessing illegal arms and cash
| conviction = 
| conviction_penalty = 
| conviction_status = Arrested
| occupation = 
| spouse = Runima Choudhury
| parents = Dinabandhu Choudhury (Father), Bhadravati Choudhury (Mother)<ref name="xy">{{cite web|url=http://in.news.yahoo.com/20/20091108/1416/tnl-ulfa-leader-s-parents-hope-for-talks.html|title=ULFA leaders parents hope for talks|last=PTI|date=November 8, 2009|accessdate=6 December 2009}} </ref>
| children = Shishir Anan Choudhury (Daughter)
}}
Sashadhar Choudhury (Assamese: শশধৰ চৌধুৰী) or Sasha Choudhury (real name Sailen Choudhury) is the Foreign Secretary of the outlawed group ULFA, Assam. His predecessor was Javed Bora. He hails from Helosa gaon in Nalbari district of Assam. He is married to Runima Choudhury and they have a daughter Shishir.

Education
Choudhury is a diploma in civil engineering and educated himself in diplomacy in Philippines. At times he represented ULFA at international foras including the UN. He is known to be the only English speaking ULFA who even interrupts his interrogators to correct their language.

Arrest
On Sunday night, November 1, 2009, some unidentified gunman took Choudhury, along with the group's finance secretary Chitrabon Hazarika away from a house in sector 3 of Uttara in Dhaka. Later they were pushed back to the Indo-Bangladesh Border where they were detained by BSF in Tripura while trying to infiltrate. They were handed over to Assam Police on November 6 by the BSF. But according to the Assam Police, the leaders surrendered before BSF in Tripura fleeing the crackdown against them in Bangladesh. Choudhury had earlier been arrested in Mizoram in 1996 and came out on bail.

On Saturday, November 7, 2009, the Special Operation Unit of the Assam police produced Choudhury and Hazarika before the court of Chief Judicial Magistrate, Kamrup (Metropolitan). His family was set free for no pending cases were there against them.

Choudhury’ stand
While replying to media-questions, Choudhury said that they had not surrendered but were arrested by Bangladeshi Police Commandos. "Mori jam kintu Sasha Choudhurye surrender nokore'' (Assamese: মৰি যাম কিন্তূ শশ চৌধুৰীয়ে surrender নকৰে; English: Sasha Choudhury will rather die than surrender)," he cleared his stand on the circumstances of his “arrest”.

Charges
On March 4, 1997, arrest warrant was issued for Choudhury. He is charged with Murder, voluntarily causing grievous hurt by dangerous weapon, mischief by causing damage, acts done by several persons infurtherrance of common intention, commission of terrorist and disruptive acts. A case is filed in Chabua PS Case No. 96/89 U/S 302/326/427/34 IP R/W Sec. 3/4 TADA(P) Act.

Reaction
On November 9, 2009, ULFA called for a 12-hour Assam bandh from 6 am demanding their unconditional release. ULFA chairman Arabinda Rajkhowa, in a statement issued through e-mail, described the two leaders’ arrest as a “ploy to sabotage the process of finding a political solution to the problem and destroy ULFA militarily.”

See also
List of top leaders of ULFA
Sanjukta Mukti Fouj
People's Consultative Group

References

People from Nalbari district
Living people
1960 births
Prisoners and detainees from Assam
ULFA members